Adamo Angelo Ruggiero (born June 9, 1986) is a Canadian actor best known for his role as Marco Del Rossi in Degrassi: The Next Generation.

Career
Ruggiero has been acting since the age of seven or eight. He has starred in many plays including Rudolph the Red-Nosed Reindeer and Bye Bye Birdie. After initially auditioning for the role of Craig Manning, a role played by Jake Epstein, he joined the Degrassi cast in 2002 with the role of Marco Del Rossi, a gay teenager who struggles to come to terms with his sexuality. Ruggiero hosted The Next Star from 2008 until 2012. In November 2008, it was announced that Ruggiero would star in the gay-themed Christmas film Make the Yuletide Gay. Principal filming started December 3, 2008.

In 2012, Ruggiero starred in the Young People's Theatre's production of The Neverending Story.

In 2013, Ruggiero participated in Salvatore Antonio's Truth/Dare: A Satire (With Dance), an interactive audience participation show which featured staged reenactments of scenes from Madonna's 1991 film Truth or Dare, at Buddies in Bad Times during Toronto's Pride Week. The show's cast also included Keith Cole and Gavin Crawford.

Personal life
Ruggiero's father, Tony, was born in Coreno Ausonio, Frosinone, Lazio, Italy. Ruggiero's mother's name is Amalia. He has an older brother named Adriano, and he is from an Italian Catholic family. Ruggiero attended the Roman Catholic St. Dunstan Elementary School and graduated from Cawthra Park Secondary School, both in Mississauga, Ontario.

Ruggiero is openly gay, having come out in January 2008 saying "I come from a traditional Italian family but they aren't so traditional that me being gay was a deal breaker." He was also on the cover of the January 23 – February 5, 2008 issue of fab magazine.

Filmography

References

External links

 

1986 births
Living people
21st-century Canadian male actors
21st-century Canadian LGBT people
Canadian gay actors
Canadian male film actors
Canadian male television actors
Canadian people of Italian descent
Canadian Roman Catholics
Canadian television personalities
Canadian television variety show hosts
LGBT Roman Catholics
Male actors from Ontario
People from Mississauga